Beni, Nepal may refer to:

Beni, Dhawalagiri, central Nepal
Beni, Sagarmatha, western Nepal

See also
Beni (disambiguation)